Kadhale En Kadhale is a 2006 Tamil-language romance film directed by PC Shekhar, making his directorial debut. The film stars newcomers Naveen, Shrutha Keerthi and Roma Asrani, with Ramakrishna, Chitra Shenoy, Avinash, newcomer Vijayalakshmi, Jiju and Raviraj playing supporting roles. It was released on 4 August 2006. The film won the Tamil Nadu State Film Award for Best Film Portraying Woman in Good Light. The film fared poorly at the box office.

Plot

Rajiv is a final-year student and also the son of a rich couple. His family friend's daughter Krithika, a shy girl, comes to stay in their house. She joins the same school as him as a first-year student, Rajiv helps her in many ways. At the college admission day, Rajiv falls under the spell of the fresher Pragathi. Krithika later left their home and moves to the college hostel. One day, Krithika falls sick and Rajiv takes care of her, therefore she falls in love with him. Every day, Krithika records her love for Rajiv in a journal in her computer. Whereas Rajiv is attracted by Pragathi's friendly approach, speech and graceful look. Rajiv does not have the courage to convey his love to Pragathi. On the final day of college, Rajiv reveals to Krithika that he is in love with her classmate Pragathi, Krithika is therefore heartbroken. Rajiv then proposes his love to Pragathi, but she doesn't reciprocate his love and humiliates him.

Rajiv later finds a job and has to go to Singapore but he does want to leave his native place. Krithika then encourages him to go, captivated by her gentle words, he moves there. After his return to the homeland, his company gives Rajiv a promotion for his work and wants to send him to the United States for a two-year project. His parents compel him to marry before he left for the US but he categorically refuses. His parents then force him to see a bride, she is none other than his ex-lover Pragathi and he refuses to marry her. One day, Pragathi meets Rajiv and apologizes for humiliating him when he proposed his love. She tells him that she has changed a lot since the suicide of her best friend Shalini.

Rajiv then decides to marry Pragathi. Their engagement goes as planned. Krithika, who seems to be happy on the outside, is, in fact, suffering on the inside. Thereafter, Krithika's father compels her daughter to get married but she could not forget Rajiv. Later, Rajiv tries to convince his well-wisher Krithika to get married, but to Rajiv's surprise, Pragathi reveals that Krithika is in love with Rajiv and was too shy to reveal her love. The film ends with Pragathi sacrificing her love.

Cast

Naveen as Rajiv
Shrutha Keerthi as Pragathi
Roma Asrani as Krithika
Ramakrishna as Rajiv's father
Chitra Shenoy as Saradha, Rajiv's mother
Avinash as Mahendran, Pragathi's father
Vijayalakshmi as Shalini
Jiju as Jiju
Raviraj as Sundaram, Krithika's father
Sathish
K. Ajay
Shankar
Sonia
Baby Deepika as Deepika

Soundtrack

The film score and the soundtrack were composed by Prayog. The soundtrack, released in 2006, features 6 tracks with lyrics written by Na. Muthukumar.

Reception
Sify stated, "The film looks more like a play than a candy floss romance as it is told at leisurely pace that induces sleep. The script is too silly and lead actors have miles to go as far as acting goes". In contrast, another critic said, "Debutant director P.C.Sekhar has succeeded in giving a good entertainer in the form of Kadhale En Kadhale" and praised the performance of the lead actors.

References

2006 films
2000s Tamil-language films
2006 romantic drama films
Indian romantic drama films
Films shot in Bangalore
Films shot in Singapore
2006 directorial debut films